Paul Reid (born 1975) is a Scottish painter who works in a figurative style. He was chosen by New Statesman as one of the Best of Young British under the age of 35, in 2002.

Critics have noted that his work tends to reject contemporary art's values, and instead harkens back to old masters such as Rembrandt and Caravaggio.

References

External links 
 Paul Reid at 108 Fine Art

20th-century Scottish painters
Scottish male painters
21st-century Scottish painters
21st-century Scottish male artists
Living people
1975 births
20th-century Scottish male artists